Identity Pieces is a 1998 Belgian/French/Congolese comedy film written and directed by Mwezé Ngangura. It premiered at the 1998 Toronto International Film Festival.

Plot
Mani Kongo (Gérard Essomba) is the king of the Bakongo. His only daughter, Mwana (Dominique Mesa), left for Belgium as a young child in hopes of becoming a doctor, but contact with her had been lost over the past few years. Mani Kongo decides to travel to Belgium in search of his beloved daughter. On arriving he will have to cope with the very best and the very worst of the black diaspora, as well as with prejudices rampant in European society. He himself will find good friends amongst poor low-class whites.

Cast
 Gérard Essomba as Mani Kongo
 Dominique Mesa as Mwana
 Jean-Louis Daulne as Chaka-Jo
 Herbert Flack as Jefke
 David Steegen as Van Loo
 Cecilia Kankonda as Safi
 Thilombo Lubambu as Mayele
 Mwanza Goutier as Viva-Wa-Viva (as Mouanza Goutier)
 Nicola Donato as Jos

Awards
Identity Pieces won several awards at the 1999 Panafrican Film and Television Festival, including the grand prize. It also won the People's Choice Award at the Denver International Film Festival.

External links
 
 

1998 films
Belgian comedy films
Democratic Republic of the Congo comedy films
Films set in Belgium
Films shot in Belgium
Films set in the Democratic Republic of the Congo
Films shot in the Democratic Republic of the Congo
French comedy
1990s French-language films
Wolof-language films
1998 comedy films
Films directed by Mwezé Ngangura
1998 multilingual films
Belgian multilingual films
French multilingual films